Scarselli is an Italian surname. Notable people with the surname include:

Adolfo Scarselli (1866–1945), Italian painter
Leonardo Scarselli (born 1975), Italian cyclist

See also
Scarsellino
Scarpelli

Italian-language surnames